The Russian Soviet Federative Socialist Republic, Russian SFSR or RSFSR, previously known as the Russian Soviet Republic and the Russian Socialist Federative Soviet Republic as well as being unofficially known as Soviet Russia, the Russian Federation or simply Russia, was an independent federal socialist state from 1917 to 1922, and afterwards the largest and most populous of the Soviet socialist republics of the Soviet Union (USSR) from 1922 to 1991, until becoming a sovereign part of the Soviet Union with priority of Russian laws over Union-level legislation in 1990 and 1991, the last two years of the existence of the USSR. The Russian Republic was composed of sixteen smaller constituent units of autonomous republics, five autonomous oblasts, ten autonomous okrugs, six krais and forty oblasts. Russians formed the largest ethnic group. The capital of the Russian SFSR was Moscow and the other major urban centers included Leningrad, Stalingrad, Novosibirsk, Sverdlovsk, Gorky and Kuybyshev. It was the first Marxist-Leninist state in the world.

The economy of Russia became heavily industrialized, accounting for about two-thirds of the electricity produced in the USSR. By 1961, it was the third largest producer of petroleum due to new discoveries in the Volga-Urals region and Siberia, trailing in production to only the United States and Saudi Arabia. In 1974, there were 475 institutes of higher education in the republic providing education in 47 languages to some 23,941,000 students. A network of territorially organized public-health services provided health care. After 1985, the "perestroika" restructuring policies of the Gorbachev administration relatively liberalised the economy, which had become stagnant since the late 1970s under General Secretary Leonid Brezhnev, with the introduction of non-state owned enterprises such as cooperatives.

On 7 November 1917 [O.S. 25 October], as a result of the October Revolution, the Russian Soviet Republic was proclaimed as a sovereign state and the world's first constitutionally socialist state guided by communist ideology. The first constitution was adopted in 1918. In 1922, the Russian SFSR signed a treaty officially creating the USSR. The Russian SFSR's 1978 constitution stated that "[a] Union Republic is a sovereign [...] state that has united [...] in the Union" and "each Union Republic shall retain the right freely to secede from the USSR". On 12 June 1990, the Congress of People's Deputies adopted the Declaration of State Sovereignty, established separation of powers (unlike in the Soviet form of government), established citizenship of Russia and stated that the RSFSR shall retain the right of free secession from the USSR. On 12 June 1991, Boris Yeltsin (1931–2007), supported by the Democratic Russia pro-reform movement, was elected the first and only president of the RSFSR, a post that would later become the presidency of the Russian Federation.

The August 1991 Soviet coup d'état attempt with the temporary brief internment of President Mikhail Gorbachev destabilised the Soviet Union. On 8 December 1991, the heads of Russia, Ukraine and Belarus signed the Belovezh Accords. The agreement declared dissolution of the USSR by its original founding states (i.e., renunciation of the 1922 Treaty on the Creation of the USSR) and established the Commonwealth of Independent States (CIS) as a loose confederation. On 12 December, the agreement was ratified by the Supreme Soviet (the parliament of Russian SFSR); therefore the Russian SFSR had renounced the Treaty on the Creation of the USSR and de facto declared Russia's independence from the USSR itself and the ties with the other Soviet Socialist Republics.

On 25 December 1991, following the resignation of Gorbachev as President of the Soviet Union (and former General Secretary of the Communist Party of the Soviet Union), the Russian SFSR was renamed the Russian Federation. The next day after the lowering of the Soviet red flag from the top of the Kremlin Senate building of the Moscow Kremlin in Moscow, the USSR was self-dissolved by the Soviet of the Republics on 26 December, which by that time was the only functioning parliamentary chamber of the All-Union Supreme Soviet (the other house, Soviet of the Union, had already lost the quorum after recall of its members by the several union republics). After the dissolution, Russia took full responsibility for all the rights and obligations of the USSR under the Charter of the United Nations, including the financial obligations. As such, Russia assumed the Soviet Union's UN membership and permanent membership on the Security Council, nuclear stockpile and the control over the armed forces; Soviet embassies abroad became Russian embassies.

The 1978 constitution of the Russian SFSR was amended several times to reflect the transition to democracy, private property and market economy. The new Russian constitution, coming into effect on 25 December 1993 after a constitutional crisis, completely abolished the Soviet form of government and replaced it with a semi-presidential system.

Nomenclature

It happened immediately after the October Revolution, when the interim Russian Provisional Government, most recently led by opposing democratic socialist Alexander Kerensky (1881–1970), which governed the new Russian Republic after the overthrow of the Russian Empire government of the Romanov imperial dynasty of Czar Nicholas II the previous March, the second of the two Russian Revolutions that turbulent year of 1917 during World War I. Initially, the state did not have an official name and wasn't recognized by neighboring countries for five months. Meanwhile, anti-Bolsheviks coined the mocking label Sovdepia for the nascent state of the Soviets of Workers' and Peasants' Deputies.

On 25 January 1918, at the third meeting of the All-Russian Congress of Soviets, the establishment of the Russian Socialist Federative Soviet Republic (RSFSR) was proclaimed. The Treaty of Brest-Litovsk was signed on 3 March 1918, giving away much of the border lands in the west of the former Russian Empire to the German Empire (Germany) in exchange for peace during the last year of the rest of World War I. In July 1918, the fifth All-Russian Congress of Soviets adopted the Constitution of the RSFSR.

Internationally, the RSFSR was recognized as an independent state in 1920 only by bordering neighbors of Estonia, Finland, Latvia and Lithuania in the Treaty of Tartu and by the short-lived Irish Republic in Ireland.

On 30 December 1922, with the treaty on the creation of the Soviet Union, Russia, alongside the Transcaucasian SFSR, the Ukrainian SSR and the Byelorussian SSR formed the Union of Soviet Socialist Republics. The final Soviet name for the constituent republic, the Russian Soviet Federative Socialist Republic, was adopted in the later Soviet Constitution of 1936. By that time, Soviet Russia had gained roughly the same borders of the old Tsardom of Russia before the Great Northern War of 1700.

The RSFSR dominated the Soviet Union to such an extent that for most of the Soviet Union's existence, it was commonly, but incorrectly, referred to as Russia. Technically, Russia itself was only one republic within the larger union – albeit by far the largest, most powerful and most highly developed of the 15 republics. Nevertheless, according to historian Matthew White it was an open secret that the country's federal structure was "window dressing" for Russian dominance. For that reason, the people of the USSR were almost always called "Russians", not "Soviets", since "everyone knew who really ran the show".

On 25 December 1991, during the collapse of the Soviet Union, which concluded on the next day, the republic's official name was changed to the Russian Federation, which it remains to this day. This name and Russia were specified as the official state names on 21 April 1992, an amendment to the then existing Constitution of 1978, and were retained as such in the subsequent 1993 Constitution of Russia.

Geography
At a total of about 17,125,200 km (6,612,100 sq mi), the Russian SFSR was the largest of its fifteen republics, with its southerly neighbor, the Kazakh SSR, being second.

The international borders of the RSFSR touched Poland on the west; Norway and Finland of Scandinavia on the northwest; and to its southeast in eastern Asia were the Democratic People's Republic of Korea (North Korea), Mongolian People's Republic (Mongolia) and the People's Republic of China (China, formerly the Republic of China; 1911–1949). Within the Soviet Union, the RSFSR bordered the Slavic states: Ukrainian SSR (Ukraine), Belarusian SSR (Belarus), the Baltic states: Estonian SSR (Estonia), Latvian SSR (Latvia) and Lithuanian SSR (Lithuania) (Included in USSR in 1940) to its west and the Azerbaijan SSR (Azerbaijan), Georgian SSR (Georgia) and Kazakh SSR (Kazakhstan) to the south in Central Asia.

Roughly 70% of the area in the RSFSR consisted of broad plains, with mountainous tundra regions mainly concentrated in the east of Siberia with Central Asia and East Asia. The area is rich in mineral resources, including petroleum, natural gas, and iron ore.

History

Early years (1917–1920)
The Soviet government first came to power on 7 November 1917, immediately after the interim Russian Provisional Government headed by Alexander Kerensky, which governed the Russian Republic, was overthrown in the October Revolution, the second of the two Russian Revolutions. The state it governed, which did not have an official name, would be unrecognized by neighboring countries for another five months.

On 18 January 1918, the newly elected Constituent Assembly issued a decree, proclaiming Russia a democratic federal republic under the name "Russian Democratic Federal Republic". However, the Bolsheviks dissolved the Assembly on the following day and declared its decrees null and void.

On 25 January 1918, at the third meeting of the All-Russian Congress of Soviets, the establishment of the Russian Socialist Federative Soviet Republic (RSFSR) was proclaimed. On 3 March 1918, the Treaty of Brest-Litovsk was signed, giving away much of the land of the former Russian Empire to the German Empire (Germany), in exchange for peace on the Eastern Front of World War I. In July 1918, the fifth All-Russian Congress of Soviets adopted the Constitution of the RSFSR. By 1918, during the Russian Civil War, several states within the former Russian Empire had seceded, reducing the size of the country even more, although some were conquered by the Bolsheviks.

1920s

The Russian famine of 1921–22, also known as Povolzhye famine, killed an estimated 5 million, primarily affecting the Volga and Ural River regions.

On 30 December 1922, the First Congress of the Soviets of the USSR approved the Treaty on the Creation of the USSR, by which Russia was united with the Ukrainian Soviet Socialist Republic, Byelorussian Soviet Socialist Republic and Transcaucasian Soviet Federal Socialist Republic into a single federal state, the Soviet Union. The treaty was included in the 1924 Soviet Constitution, adopted on 31 January 1924 by the Second Congress of Soviets of the USSR.

Paragraph 3 of Chapter 1 of the 1925 Constitution of the RSFSR stated the following:

1930s

Many regions in Russia were affected by the Soviet famine of 1932–1933: Volga, Central Black Soil Region, North Caucasus, the Urals, the Crimea, part of Western Siberia, and the Kazak ASSR. With the adoption of the 1936 Soviet Constitution on 5 December 1936, the size of the RSFSR was significantly reduced. The Kazakh ASSR and Kirghiz ASSR were transformed into the Kazakh SSR (Kazakhstan) and Kirghiz Soviet Socialist Republic (Kyrgyzstan). The former Karakalpak Autonomous Socialist Soviet Republic was transferred to the Uzbek Soviet Socialist Republic (Uzbekistan).

The final name for the republic during the Soviet era was adopted by the Russian Constitution of 1937, which renamed it the Russian Soviet Federative Socialist Republic (RSFSR).

1940s

However, after the defeat in the Battle of Moscow and the Soviet winter offensive, the Germans were pushed back. In 1942, the Wehrmacht entered Stalingrad. Despite a deadly 5 month lasting battle in which the Soviets suffered over 1,100,000 casualties, they achieved victory following the surrender of the last German troops near the Volga River.

In 1943, Karachay Autonomous Oblast was dissolved by Joseph Stalin (1878–1953), General Secretary of the Communist Party, later Premier, when the Karachays were exiled to Central Asia for their alleged collaboration with the invading Germans in the Great Patriotic War (World War II, 1941–1945), and territory was incorporated into the Georgian SSR.

On 3 March 1944, on the orders of Stalin, the Chechen-Ingush ASSR was disbanded and its population forcibly deported upon the accusations of collaboration with the invaders and separatism. The territory of the ASSR was divided between other administrative units of Russian SFSR and the Georgian SSR.

On 11 October 1944, the Tuvan People's Republic was joined with the Russian SFSR as the Tuvan Autonomous Oblast, becoming an Autonomous Soviet Socialist Republic in 1961.

After reconquering Estonia and Latvia in 1944, the Russian SFSR annexed their easternmost territories around Ivangorod and within the modern Pechorsky and Pytalovsky Districts in 1944–1945.

At the end of World War II Soviet troops of the Red Army occupied southern Sakhalin Island and the Kuril Islands off the coast of East Asia, north of Japan, making them part of the RSFSR. The status of the southernmost Kurils, north of Hokkaido of the Japanese home islands remains in dispute with Japan and the United States following the peace treaty of 1951 ending the state of war.

On 17 April 1946, the Kaliningrad Oblast – the north-eastern portion of the former Kingdom of Prussia, the founding state of the German Empire (1871–1918) and later the German province of East Prussia including the capital and Baltic seaport city of Königsberg – was annexed by the Soviet Union and made part of the Russian SFSR.

1950s
After the death of Joseph Stalin on 5 March 1953, Georgy Malenkov became the new leader of the USSR. In January 1954, Malenkov transferred Crimea from the Russian SFSR to the Ukrainian SSR. On 8 February 1955, Malenkov was officially demoted to deputy Prime Minister. As First Secretary of the Central Committee of the Communist Party, Nikita Khrushchev's authority was significantly enhanced by Malenkov's demotion.

The Karelo-Finnish SSR was transferred back to the RSFSR as the Karelian ASSR in 1956.

On 9 January 1957, Karachay Autonomous Oblast and Chechen-Ingush Autonomous Soviet Socialist Republic were restored by Khrushchev and they were transferred from the Georgian SSR back to the Russian SFSR.

1960s–1980s
In 1964, Nikita Khrushchev was removed from his position of power and replaced with Leonid Brezhnev. Under his rule, the Russian SFSR and the rest of the Soviet Union went through a mass era of stagnation. Even after Brezhnev's death in 1982, the era did not end until Mikhail Gorbachev took power in March 1985 and introduced liberal reforms in Soviet society.

On 12 April 1978, a new Constitution of Russia was adopted.

Early 1990s

On 29 May 1990, at his third attempt, Boris Yeltsin was elected the chairman of the Supreme Soviet of the Russian SFSR. The Congress of People's Deputies of the Republic adopted the Declaration of State Sovereignty of the Russian SFSR on 12 June 1990, which was the beginning of the "War of Laws", pitting the Soviet Union against the Russian Federation and other constituent republics.

On 17 March 1991, an all-Russian referendum created the post of President of the RSFSR and on 12 June, Boris Yeltsin was elected President by popular vote.

During the unsuccessful 1991 Soviet coup d'état attempt of 19–21 August 1991 in Moscow, the capital of the Soviet Union and Russia, Yeltsin strongly supported the President of the Soviet Union, Mikhail Gorbachev. On 23 August, Yeltsin, in the presence of Gorbachev, signed a decree suspending all activity by the Communist Party of the Russian SFSR in the territory of Russia. On 6 November, he went further, banning the Communist Parties of the USSR and the RSFSR in the RSFSR.

On 8 December 1991, at Viskuli near Brest (Belarus), Yeltsin, Ukrainian President Leonid Kravchuk and Belarusian leader Stanislav Shushkevich signed the "Agreement on the Establishment of the Commonwealth of Independent States", known in media as the Belovezh Accords. The document, consisting of a preamble and fourteen articles, stated that the Soviet Union no longer existed "as a subject of international law and geopolitical reality". However, based on the historical community of peoples and relations between the three states, as well as bilateral treaties, the desire for a democratic rule of law, the intention to develop their relations based on mutual recognition and respect for state sovereignty, the parties agreed to the formation of the Commonwealth of Independent States. On 12 December, the agreement was ratified by the Supreme Soviet of the Russian SFSR by an overwhelming majority: 188 votes for, 6 against and 7 abstentions. The legality of this ratification raised doubts among some members of the Russian parliament, since according to the Constitution of the RSFSR of 1978 consideration of this document was in the exclusive jurisdiction of the Congress of People's Deputies of the RSFSR. However, by this time the Soviet government had been rendered more or less impotent, and was in no position to object. On the same day, the Supreme Soviet of the Russian SFSR denounced the Treaty on the Creation of the USSR and recalled all Russian deputies from the Supreme Soviet of the Soviet Union. A number of lawyers believe that the denunciation of the union treaty was meaningless since it became invalid in 1924 with the adoption of the first constitution of the USSR. Although the 12 December vote is sometimes reckoned as the moment that the RSFSR seceded from the collapsing Soviet Union, this is not the case. It appears that the RSFSR took the line that it did not need to follow the secession process delineated in the Soviet Constitution because it was not possible to secede from a country that no longer existed.

On 24 December, Yeltsin informed the Secretary-General of the United Nations that by agreement of the member states of the CIS the Russian Federation would assume the membership of the Soviet Union in all UN organs (including the Soviet Union's permanent seat on the UN Security Council). Russia took full responsibility for all the rights and obligations of the USSR under the Charter of the United Nations, including the financial obligations, and assumed control over its nuclear stockpile and the armed forces; Soviet embassies abroad became Russian embassies. On 25 December – just hours after Gorbachev resigned as president of the Soviet Union – the Russian SFSR was renamed the Russian Federation (Russia), reflecting that it was now a sovereign state with Yeltsin assuming the Presidency. That same night, the Soviet flag was lowered and replaced with the tricolor. The Soviet Union officially ceased to exist the next day. The change was originally published on 6 January 1992 (Rossiyskaya Gazeta). According to law, during 1992, it was allowed to use the old name of the RSFSR for official business (forms, seals, and stamps).

On 21 April 1992, the Congress of People's Deputies of Russia approved the renaming of the RSFSR into the Russian Federation, by making appropriate amendments to the Constitution, which entered into force 
since publication on 16 May 1992.

Government

The Government was known officially as the Council of People's Commissars (1917–1946) and Council of Ministers (1946–1991). The first government was headed by Vladimir Lenin as Chairman of the Council of People's Commissars of the Russian SFSR and the last by Boris Yeltsin as both head of government and head of state under the title of president. The Russian SFSR was controlled by the Communist Party of the Soviet Union until the 1991 August coup, which prompted President Yeltsin to suspend the recently created Communist Party of the Russian Soviet Federative Socialist Republic.

Autonomous republics
 Turkestan ASSR was formed on 30 April 1918 on the territory of the former Turkestan General-Governorate. As part of the delimitation programme of Soviet Central Asia, the Turkestan ASSR along with the Khorezm SSR and the Bukharan PSR were disbanded on 27 October 1924 and replaced by the Soviet Union republics of Turkmen SSR and Uzbek SSR. The latter contained the Tajik ASSR until December 1929, when it too became a full Union republic, the Tajik SSR. The RSFSR retained the newly formed Kara-Kirghiz and the Kara-Kalpak autonomous oblasts. The latter was part of the Kirgiz, then the Kazak ASSR until 1930 when it was directly subordinated to Moscow.
 Bashkir ASSR was formed on 23 March 1919 from several northern districts of the Orenburg Governorate populated by Bashkirs. On 11 October 1990, it declared its sovereignty, as the Bashkir SSR, which in 1992 was renamed the Republic of Bashkortostan.
 Tatar ASSR was formed on 27 May 1920 on the territory of the western two-thirds of the Kazan Governorate populated by Tatars. On 30 October 1990, it declared sovereignty as the Republic of Tatarstan and on 18 October 1991 declared its independence. The Russian constitutional court overturned the declaration on 13 March 1992. In February 1994, a separate agreement was reached with Moscow on the status of Tatarstan as an associate state in Russia with confederate status.
 Kirgiz ASSR was formed on 26 August 1920 from the Ural, Turgay, Semipalatinsk oblasts and parts of Transcaspia, Bukey Horde and Orenburg Governorate populated by Kirgiz-Kaysaks (former name of Kazakh people). Further enlarged in 1921 upon gaining land from Omsk Governorate and again in 1924 from parts of Jetysui Governorate and Syr Darya and Samarkand oblasts. On 19 April 1925, it was renamed Kazak ASSR. (see below)
 Mountain ASSR was formed on 20 January 1921 after the Bolshevik Red Army evicted the short-lived Mountainous Republic of the Northern Caucasus. Initially composed of several national districts, one-by-one these left the republic until 7 November 1924 when the remains of the republic was partitioned into the Ingush Autonomous Oblast, the North Ossetian Autonomous Oblast and the Sunzha Cossack District (all subordinates to the North Caucasus Krai).
 Dagestan ASSR was formed on 20 January 1921 from the former Dagestan Oblast. On 17 September 1991, it declared sovereignty as the Dagestan SSR.
 Crimean ASSR was formed on 18 October 1921 on the territory of Crimean peninsula, following the Red Army's defeat of Baron Wrangel's army, ending the Russian Civil War in Europe. On 18 May 1944, it was reduced to the status of Oblast alongside the deportation of the Crimean Tatars as collective punishment for alleged collaboration with the German occupation regime in Taurida Subdistrict. On 19 February 1954, it was transferred to the Ukrainian SSR.
 Yakut ASSR was formed on 16 February 1922 upon the elevation of the Yakut Autonomous Oblast into an ASSR. On 27 September 1990, it declared sovereignty as the Yakut-Sakha Soviet Socialist Republic. From 21 December 1991, it has been known as the Republic of Sakha (Yakutia).
 Buryat ASSR was formed on 30 March 1923 as due to the merger of the Mongol-Buryat Autonomous Oblast of the RSFSR and the Buryat-Mongol Autonomous Oblast of the Far Eastern Republic. Until 7 July 1958 – Mongol-Buryat ASSR. On 27 March 1991, it became the Republic of Buryatia.
 Karelian ASSR was formed on 23 July 1923 when the Karelian Labor Commune was integrated into the RSFSR's administrative structure. On 31 March 1940, it was elevated into a full Union republic as the Karelo-Finnish SSR. On 16 July 1956, it was downgraded in status to that of an ASSR and re-subordinated to RSFSR. It declared sovereignty on 13 October 1991 as the Republic of Karelia.
 Volga German ASSR was formed on 19 December 1924 upon elevation of the Volga German Autonomous Oblast into an ASSR. On 28 August 1941, upon the deportation of Volga Germans to Central Asia, the ASSR was disbanded. The territory was partitioned between the Saratov and Stalingrad Oblasts.
 Kazak ASSR was formed on 19 April 1925 when the first Kirghiz ASSR was renamed and partitioned. Upon the ratification of the new Soviet constitution, the ASSR was elevated into a full Union Republic on 3 December 1936. On 25 October 1990, it declared sovereignty and on 16 December 1991 its independence as the Republic of Kazakhstan.
 Chuvash ASSR was formed on 21 April 1925 upon the elevation of the Chuvash Autonomous Oblast into an ASSR. It declared sovereignty on 26 October 1990 as the Chuvash SSR.
 Kirghiz ASSR was formed on 1 February 1926 upon elevation of the Kirghiz Autonomous Oblast. Upon the ratification of the new Soviet constitution, the ASSR was elevated into a full Union Republic on 3 December 1936. On 12 December 1990, it declared sovereignty as the Republic of Kyrgyzstan and on 31 August 1991 its independence.
 Kara-Kalpak ASSR was formed on 20 March 1932 upon elevation of the Kara-Kalpak Autonomous Oblast into the Kara-Kalpak ASSR; from 5 December 1936 a part of the Uzbek SSR. In 1964, it was renamed the Karakalpak ASSR. It declared sovereignty on 14 December 1990.
 Mordovian ASSR was formed on 20 December 1934 upon the elevation of Mordovian Autonomous Oblast into an ASSR. It declared sovereignty on 13 December 1990 as the Mordovian SSR. Since 25 January 1991, it has been known as the Republic of Mordovia.
 Udmurt ASSR was formed on 28 December 1934 upon the elevation of Udmurt Autonomous Oblast into an ASSR. It declared sovereignty on 20 September 1990. Since 11 October 1991, it has been known as the Udmurt Republic.
 Kalmyk ASSR was formed on 20 October 1935 upon the elevation of Kalmyk Autonomous Oblast into an ASSR. On 27 December 1943, upon the deportation of the Kalmyks, the ASSR was disbanded and split between the newly established Astrakhan Oblast and parts adjoined to Rostov Oblast, Krasnodar Krai and Stavropol Krai. On 9 January 1957, Kalmyk Autonomous Oblast was re-established in its present borders, first as a part of Stavropol Krai and from 19 July 1958 as a part of the Kalmyk ASSR. On 18 October 1990, it declared sovereignty as the Kalmyk SSR.
 Kabardino-Balkar ASSR was formed on 5 December 1936 upon the departure of the Kabardino-Balkar Autonomous Oblast from the North Caucasus Kray. After the deportation of the Balkars on 8 April 1944, the republic is renamed as Kabardin ASSR and parts of its territory transferred to Georgian SSR. Upon the return of the Balkars, the KBASSR is re-instated on 9 January 1957. On 31 January 1991, the republic declared sovereignty as the Kabardino-Balkar SSR and from 10 March 1992 as the Kabardino-Balkarian Republic.
 Northern Ossetian ASSR was formed on 5 December 1936 upon the disbandment of the North Caucasus Kray and its constituent North Ossetian Autonomous Oblast was raised into an ASSR. Declared sovereignty on 26 December 1990 as the North Ossetian SSR.
 Chechen-Ingush ASSR was formed on 5 December 1936 when the North Caucasus Krai was disestablished and its constituent Chechen-Ingush Autonomous Oblast was elevated into an ASSR and subordinated to Moscow. Following the en masse deportation of the Chechens and Ingush, on 7 March 1944 the ChIASSR was disbanded and the Grozny Okrug was temporarily administered by Stavropol Kray until 22 March when the territory was portioned between North Ossetian and Dagestan ASSRs and the Georgian SSR. The remaining land was merged with Stavropol Krays Kizlyar district and organised as Grozny Oblast, which existed until 9 January 1957 when the ChIASSR was re-established though only the southern border's original shape was retained. It declared sovereignty on 27 November 1990 as the Chechen-Ingush Republic. On 8 June 1991, the 2nd Chechen National Congress proclaimed a separate Chechen-Republic (Noxchi-Cho) and on 6 September began a coup which overthrew the Soviet local government. De facto, all authority passed to the self-proclaimed government which was renamed as the Chechen Republic of Ichkeria in early 1993. In response, the western Ingush districts after a referendum on 28 November 1991 were organised into an Ingush Republic which was officially established on 4 June 1992 by decree of Russian President as the Republic of Ingushetia. The same decree de jure created a Chechen republic, although it would be established only on 3 June 1994 and carry out partial governance during the First Chechen War. The Khasavyurt Accord would again suspend the government on 15 November 1996. The present Chechen Republic government was re-established on 15 October 1999.
 Komi ASSR was formed on 5 December 1936 upon the elevation of the Komi (Zyryan) Autonomous Oblast into an ASSR. Declared sovereignty on 23 November 1990 as the Komi SSR and from 26 May 1992 as the Republic of Komi.
 Mari ASSR was formed on 5 December 1936 upon the elevation of the Mari Autonomous Oblast into an ASSR. Declared Sovereignty on 22 December 1990 as the Mari Soviet Socialist Republic (Mari El).
 Tuva ASSR was formed on 10 October 1961 when the Tuva Autonomous Oblast was elevated into an ASSR. On 12 December 1990, it declared sovereignty as the Soviet Republic of Tyva.
 Gorno-Altai ASSR was formed on 25 October 1990 when Gorno-Altai Autonomous Oblast declared sovereignty. Since 3 July 1991, it has been known as the Gorno-Altai SSR.
 Karachayevo-Cherkessian ASSR was formed on 17 November 1990 when Karachay-Cherkess Autonomous Oblast was elevated into an ASSR and instead of Stavropol Krai subordinated directly to the RSFSR. It declared sovereignty on 3 July 1991 as the Karachay-Cherkess SSR.

Economy 
In the first years of the existence of the RSFSR, the doctrine of war communism became the starting point of the state's economic activity. In March 1921, at the X Congress of the RCP (B), the tasks of the policy of "war communism" were recognized by the country's leadership as fulfilled, and a new economic policy was introduced at the suggestion of Vladimir Lenin.

After the formation of the Soviet Union, the economy of the RSFSR became an integral part of the economy of the USSR. The economic program of the RSFSR (NEP) was continued in all union republics. The Gosplan (State General Planning Commission) of the RSFSR, which replaced GOELRO, was reorganized into the Gosplan of the USSR. His early task was to develop a unified national economic plan based on the electrification plan and to oversee the overall implementation of this plan.

Unlike the previous Russian constitutions, the 1978 Constitution devoted an entire chapter (Chapter II) to the description of the economic system of the RSFSR, which defined the types of property and indicated the goals of the economic tasks of the state.

As noted by Corresponding Member RAS RAS V. I. Suslov, who took part in large-scale studies of the relationship between the economies of the republics of the USSR and the RSFSR in the late Soviet era: "The degree of inequality of economic exchange was very high, and Russia was always the losing side. The product created by Russia largely supported the consumption of other union republics".

Culture

National holidays and symbols

The public holidays for the Russian SFSR included Defender of the Fatherland Day (23 February), which honors Russian men, especially those serving in the army; International Women's Day (8 March), which combines the traditions of Mother's Day and Valentine's Day; Spring and Labor Day (1 May); Victory Day; and like all other Soviet republics, the Great October Socialist Revolution (7 November).

Victory Day is the second most popular holiday in Russia as it commemorates the victory over Nazism in the Great Patriotic War. A huge military parade, hosted by the President of Russia, is annually organised in Moscow on Red Square. Similar parades take place in all major Russian cities and cities with the status Hero City or City of Military Glory.

During its 76-year existence, the Russian SFSR anthem was the same as the Soviet anthem (unlike other republics): The Internationale until 1944 and then the State Anthem of the USSR. In 1990, the RSFSR adopted its own separate anthem called Patrioticheskaya Pesnya, which went on to become the anthem of independent Russia since 1991. In 2000, Vladimir Putin re-introduced the Soviet anthem. The motto "Workers of the world, unite!" was commonly used and shared with other Soviet republics. The hammer and sickle and the full Soviet coat of arms are still widely seen in Russian cities as part of architectural decorations. The Soviet red stars are also encountered, often on military equipment and war memorials. The Red Banner continues to be honored, especially the Banner of Victory of 1945.

The Matryoshka doll is a recognizable symbol of the Russian SFSR (and the Soviet Union as a whole) and the towers of Moscow Kremlin and Saint Basil's Cathedral in Moscow are Russian SFSR's main architectural icons. Chamomile is the national flower while birch is the national tree. The Russian bear is an animal symbol and a national personification of Russia. Though this image has a Western origin, Russians themselves have accepted it. The native Soviet Russian national personification is Mother Russia.

Flag history

The flag of the Russian SFSR changed numerous times, with the original being a field of red with the Russian name of the republic written on the flag's centre in white. This flag had always been intended to be temporary, as it was changed less than a year after its adoption. The second flag had the letters РСФСР (RSFSR) written in yellow within the canton and encased within two yellow lines forming a right angle. The next flag was used from 1937, notably during World War II. Interesting because it was used until Joseph Stalin's death when a major vexillological reform was undertaken within the Soviet Union. This change incorporated an update for all the flags of the Soviet Republics as well as for the flag of the Soviet Union itself. The flag of the Russian SFSR was now a defaced version of the flag of the Soviet Union, with the main difference being a minor repositioning of the hammer and sickle and most notably adding a blue vertical stripe to the hoist. This version of the flag was used from 1954 all the way to 1991, where it was changed due to the ongoing collapse of the Soviet Union. The flag was changed to a design that resembled the original ensign of the Tsardom of Russia and the Russian Empire, with a notable difference of the flag ratio being 1:2 instead of the original 2:3 ratio. After 1993, when the Soviet form of government was officially dissolved in the Russian Federation, the flag of the Russian Federation was changed to the original civil ensign with its original 2:3 proportions.

Bibliographies 
 Bibliography of the Russian Revolution and Civil War
 Bibliography of Stalinism and the Soviet Union
 Bibliography of the post-Stalinist Soviet Union

Notes

References

External links
  Full Texts and All Laws Amending Constitutions of the Russian SFSR
 Russian Federation; The Whole Republic a Construction Site by D. S. Polyanski.
 Full 1918 RSFSR Constitution

 
Republics of the Soviet Union
Communism in Russia

Former socialist republics
Russian-speaking countries and territories
20th century in Russia
States and territories established in 1917
States and territories disestablished in 1991
1917 establishments in Russia
1991 disestablishments in the Soviet Union
Former countries in Asia
Former countries in Europe
Federal republics
Modern history of Russia
Former countries
Communist states
Totalitarian states